A turret clock or tower clock is a clock designed to be mounted high in the wall of a building, usually in a clock tower, in public buildings such as churches, university buildings, and town halls. As a public amenity to enable the community to tell the time, it has a large face visible from far away, and often a striking mechanism which rings bells upon the hours.

The turret clock is one of the earliest types of clock. Beginning in 12th century Europe, towns and monasteries built clocks in high towers to strike bells to call the community to prayer. Public clocks played an important timekeeping role in daily life until the 20th century, when accurate watches became cheap enough for ordinary people to afford. Today the time-disseminating functions of turret clocks are not much needed, and they are mainly built and preserved for traditional, decorative, and artistic reasons.

To turn the large hands and run the striking train, the mechanism of turret clocks must be more powerful than that of ordinary clocks. Traditional turret clocks are large pendulum clocks run by hanging weights, but modern ones are often run by electricity.

History

Water clocks
Water clocks are reported as early as 4000 B.C. and were used in the ancient world, but these were domestic clocks. Beginning in the Middle Ages around 1000 A.D. striking water clocks were invented, which rang bells on the canonical hours for the purpose of calling the community to prayer. Installed in clock towers in cathedrals, monasteries and town squares so they could be heard at long distances, these were the first turret clocks.  By the 13th century towns in Europe competed with each other to build the most elaborate, beautiful clocks. Water clocks kept time by the rate of water flowing through an orifice. Since the rate of flow varies with pressure which is proportional to the height of water in the source container, and viscosity which varies with temperature during the day, water clocks had limited accuracy. Other disadvantages were that they required water to be manually hauled in a bucket from a well or river to fill the clock reservoir every day, and froze solid in winter.

Verge and foliot clocks
The first all-mechanical clocks which emerged in Europe in the late 13th century kept time with a verge escapement and foliot (also known as crown and balance wheels). In the second half of the 14th century, over 500 striking turret clocks were installed in public buildings all over Europe. The new mechanical clocks were easier to maintain than water clocks, as the power to run the clock was provided by turning a crank to raise a weight on a cord, and they also did not freeze during winter, so they became the standard mechanism used in the turret clocks being installed in bell towers in churches, cathedrals, monasteries and town halls all over Europe.

The verge and foliot timekeeping mechanism in these early mechanical clocks was very inaccurate, as the primitive foliot balance wheel did not have a balance spring to provide a restoring force, so the balance wheel was not a harmonic oscillator with an inherent resonant frequency or "beat"; its rate varied with variations in the force of the wheel train. The error in the first mechanical clocks may have been several hours per day.  Therefore, the clock had to be frequently reset by the passage of the sun or stars overhead.

Pendulum clocks
The pendulum clock was invented and patented in 1657 by Dutch scientist Christiaan Huygens, inspired by the superior timekeeping properties of the pendulum discovered beginning in 1602 by Italian scientist Galileo Galilei. Pendulum clocks were much more accurate than the previous foliot clocks, improving timekeeping accuracy of the best precision clocks from 15 minutes per day to perhaps 10 seconds a day. Within a few decades most tower clocks throughout Europe were rebuilt to convert the previous verge and foliot escapement to pendulums. Almost no examples of the original verge and foliot mechanisms of these early clocks have survived to the present day.

The accuracy of the pendulum clock was increased by the invention of the anchor escapement in 1657 by Robert Hooke, which quickly replaced the primitive verge escapement in pendulum clocks. The first tower clock with the new escapement was the Wadham College Clock, built at Wadham College, Oxford, UK, in 1670, probably by clockmaker Joseph Knibb. The anchor escapement reduced the pendulum's width of swing from 80 to 100° in the verge clock to 3-6°. This greatly reduced the energy consumed by the pendulum, and allowed longer pendulums to be used.

Tower clocks had a source of error not found in other clocks: the varying torque on the wheel train caused by the weight of the huge external clock hands as they turned, which was made worse by seasonal snow, ice and wind loads on the hands. The variations in force, applied to the pendulum by the escape wheel, caused the period of the pendulum to vary. During the 19th century specialized escapements were invented for tower clocks to mitigate this problem. In the most common type, called gravity escapements, instead of applying the force of the gear train to push the pendulum directly, the escape wheel instead lifted a weighted lever, which was then released and its weight gave the pendulum a push during its downward swing. This isolated the pendulum from variations in the drive force. One of the most widely used types was the three-legged gravity escapement invented in 1854 by Edmund Beckett (Lord Grimsthorpe).

Electrical clocks

Electric turret clocks and hybrid mechanical/electric clocks were introduced in the late 19th century.

Some mechanical turret clocks are wound by electric motor. These still are considered mechanical clocks.

Table of early public turret clocks

This table shows some of the turret clocks which were installed throughout Europe. It is not complete and mainly serves to illustrate the rate of adoption. There are hardly any surviving turret clock mechanisms that date before 1400, and because of extensive rebuilding of clocks the authenticity of those that do survive is disputed.  What little is known of their mechanisms is mostly gleaned from manuscript sources.

The "country" column refers to the present (2012) international boundaries. For example, Colmar was in Germany in 1370, but is now in France.

Thirteenth century

The verge and foliot escapement is thought to have been introduced sometime at the end of the thirteenth century, so very few if any of these clocks had foliot mechanisms; most were water clocks or in a few cases, possibly mercury.

Fourteenth century
During the fourteenth century, the emergence of the foliot replaced the high-maintenance water clocks. It is not known when that happened exactly and which of the early 14th century clocks were water clocks and which ones use a foliot.

The Heinrich von Wieck clock in Paris dating from 1362 is the first clock of which it is known with certainty that it had a foliot and a verge escapement. The fact that there is a sudden increase in the number of recorded turret clock installations points to the fact that these new clocks use verge & foliot. This happens in the years 1350 and onwards.

It becomes apparent that even small towns can afford to put up public striking clocks. Turret clocks are now common throughout Europe.

No surviving clock mechanisms (apart from the claims from Salisbury and Wells) is known from this era.

See also
History of timekeeping devices
List of clocks

References

C. F. C. Beeson English Church Clocks London 1971
Christopher McKay (Editor) The Great Salisbury Clock Trial, Antiquarian Horological Society Turret Clock Group, 1993
Alfred Ungerer Les horloges astronomiques et monumentales les plus remarquables de l'antiquité jusquà nos jours, Strasbourg, 1931
Ferdinand Berthoud  Histoire de la mesure du temps par les horloges, Imprimerie de la Republique, 1802
Gustav Bilfinger Die Mittelalterlichen Horen und die Modernen Stunden, Stuttgart, 1892
F.J. Britten Old clocks and their makers:an historical and descriptive account of the different styles of clocks of the past in England and abroad : with a list of over eleven thousand makers, London, 1910
Ernst Zinner Aus der Frühzeit der Räderuhr. Von der Gewichtsuhr zur Federzuguhr München, 1954

 
Clock designs
Turrets
Clocks